The 2018 Atlantic 10 Conference baseball tournament took place from May 23 to 26. The top seven regular season finishers of the league's twelve teams metin the double-elimination tournament, which was at Tucker Field at Barcroft Park, the home field of George Washington. As champion, Saint Louis earned the conference's automatic bid to the 2018 NCAA Division I baseball tournament.

Seeding and format
The tournament used the same format adopted in 2014, with the top seven finishers from the regular season seeded one through seven. As the top seed, Saint Louis received a single bye while remaining seeds played on the first day.

Results

References

Tournament
Atlantic 10 Conference Baseball Tournament
Atlantic 10 Conference baseball tournament
Atlantic 10 Conference baseball tournament
Baseball in Virginia
College sports in Virginia
Sports competitions in Virginia
Sports in the Washington metropolitan area
Tourist attractions in Arlington County, Virginia